The women's marathon at the 2003 World Championships in Paris, France, was held on Sunday, 31 August 2003, starting at 14:20h local time.

Medalists

Abbreviations
All times shown are in hours:minutes:seconds

Intermediates

Final ranking

See also
 Athletics at the 2003 Pan American Games – Women's marathon
 2003 World Marathon Cup
 Athletics at the 2004 Summer Olympics – Women's marathon

References
 Results

M
Marathons at the World Athletics Championships
2003 marathons
Women's marathons
World Championships in Athletics marathon
Marathons in France

nl:IAAF wereldkampioenschap marathon 2003